Vladislav Zlatinov (born 23 March 1983) is a Bulgarian footballer who plays as a forward who plays for Bulgarian Second League club Septemvri Simitli. He is a product of CSKA Sofia's youth system and was the Bulgarian Second Division's top scorer for 2004 with 21 goals.

On 10 March 2017, Zlatinov joined Bansko but left the club at the end of the season. In August 2017, Zlatinov joined Gamma Ethniki side Mylopotamos.  In January 2018, Zlatinov returned to his hometown club Vihren.

In June 2018, Zlatinov made another return to Pirin Blagoevgrad where his brother Petar was appointed as manager.

Honours

Club
CSKA Sofia
Bulgarian Supercup: 2008

References

External links
 

1983 births
Living people
People from Sandanski
Bulgarian footballers
First Professional Football League (Bulgaria) players
Second Professional Football League (Bulgaria) players
Gamma Ethniki players
OFC Vihren Sandanski players
OFC Pirin Blagoevgrad players
PFC Lokomotiv Plovdiv players
PFC Beroe Stara Zagora players
PFC CSKA Sofia players
FC Bansko players
PFC Slavia Sofia players
FC Montana players
PFC Lokomotiv Mezdra players
FC Septemvri Simitli players
Bulgarian expatriate footballers
Bulgarian expatriate sportspeople in Greece
Expatriate footballers in Greece
Association football forwards
Sportspeople from Blagoevgrad Province